Metisella abdeli, the eastern sylph, is a butterfly in the family Hesperiidae. It is found in Cameroon, the Democratic Republic of the Congo, Uganda, Rwanda, Burundi, Kenya, Tanzania, Zambia, Malawi, Mozambique, Zimbabwe and Eswatini. The habitat consists of forests.

Adults are on wing year round.

Subspecies
Metisella abdeli abdeli (Cameroon, Democratic Republic of the Congo, Uganda, Rwanda, Burundi, Kenya, Tanzania, north-eastern Zambia, Malawi, Mozambique, eastern Zimbabwe, Eswatini )
Metisella abdeli elgona Evans, 1938 (near the summit of Mount Elgon in Kenya and Uganda)

References

Butterflies described in 1928
Heteropterinae